The 2022–23 Clemson Tigers men's basketball team represented Clemson University during the 2022–23 NCAA Division I men's basketball season. The Tigers were led by thirteenth-year head coach Brad Brownell and played their home games at Littlejohn Coliseum in Clemson, South Carolina as members of the Atlantic Coast Conference.

Clemson started the season 6–0 in ACC play for the first time since the ACC was created as a conference.  Their previous best was in the 1996–97 season when they started 5–0.  The Tigers continued their run by defeating Duke but then lost to Wake Forest to end their undefeated run.  They won their next two games and were 9–1 at the halfway point of the conference season.  This gave the team its best six, seven, eight, nine and ten game starts in conference history.  The Tigers would set another program record on February 15, 2023 when they defeated Florida State 94–54 at home.  This was the Tigers' largest victory in ACC play, beating the previous record of a 34 point win in 1975.

Previous season
The Tigers finished the 2021–22 season 17–16, 8–12 in ACC play to finish in 10th place. In the ACC tournament, they defeated NC State before losing eventual champions Virginia Tech in the second round. They failed to receive an invitation to the NCAA tournament or the National Invitation Tournament.

Offseason

Departures

Incoming transfers

2022 recruiting class

2023 recruiting class

Roster

Schedule and results

|-
!colspan=9 style=| Exhibition

|-
!colspan=9 style=| Regular season

|-
!colspan=9 style=|ACC tournament

|-
!colspan=12 style=| NIT

Source

Rankings

See also
2022–23 Clemson Tigers women's basketball team

References

Clemson Tigers men's basketball seasons
Clemson
Clemson
Clemson
Clemson